Drangov Peak is a peak rising to 430 m in the southeast extremity of Breznik Heights on Greenwich Island, Antarctica.  Situated 360 m southeast of Vratsa Peak, 1.45 km east by south of the highest point of Viskyar Ridge, 2.8 km west of Fort Point, 500 m north of Ziezi Peak, and 2.37 km northeast of Sartorius Point.  Overlooking Musala Glacier to the north, and Targovishte Glacier to the southwest.  Bulgarian topographic survey Tangra 2004/05.  Named after Col. Boris Drangov (1872–1917), a renowned Bulgarian military commander and pedagogue.

Maps
 L.L. Ivanov et al. Antarctica: Livingston Island and Greenwich Island, South Shetland Islands. Scale 1:100000 topographic map. Sofia: Antarctic Place-names Commission of Bulgaria, 2005.
 L.L. Ivanov. Antarctica: Livingston Island and Greenwich, Robert, Snow and Smith Islands. Scale 1:120000 topographic map.  Troyan: Manfred Wörner Foundation, 2009.

References
 Drangov Peak. SCAR Composite Gazetteer of Antarctica
 Bulgarian Antarctic Gazetteer. Antarctic Place-names Commission. (details in Bulgarian, basic data in English)

External links
 Drangov Peak. Copernix satellite image

Mountains of Greenwich Island
Bulgaria and the Antarctic